Petrunin (masculine) or Petrunina (feminine) is a Russian last name shared by the following people:

 Daniil Petrunin (born 1999), Russian football player
 Nikolay Petrunin (1976–2022), Russian politician

Russian-language surnames